Radio Breza is a Bosnian local commercial radio station, broadcasting from Breza, Bosnia and Herzegovina. This radio station broadcasts a variety of programs such as folk and pop music with local news.

When war in Bosnia and Herzegovina started, Radio Breza was founded on 8 July 1992 as local/municipal public radio station. In 2000, radio station was re-registered in Communications Regulatory Agency of Bosnia and Herzegovina as private, commercial radio station.

Program is mainly produced in Bosnian language at one FM frequency (Breza ) and it is available in the city of Breza as well as in nearby municipalities in Zenica-Doboj Canton and Sarajevo Canton area.

Estimated number of listeners of Radio Breza is around 54.007. Radio Breza is also available via internet and via CATV platform in BiH (Telemach - Channel 634).

Frequencies
 Breza

See also 
 List of radio stations in Bosnia and Herzegovina
 Radio Visoko
 Radio Kakanj
 Radio Ilijaš
 Radio Zenica
 Radio Vogošća

References

External links 
 www.radiobreza.com.ba
 www.radiostanica.ba
 www.fmscan.org
 Communications Regulatory Agency of Bosnia and Herzegovina

Breza
Radio stations established in 1992